Martín Matías Ezequiel Vargas (born 8 May 1997), nicknamed Monito (in English: "Little Monkey") is an Argentine professional footballer who plays as a left winger for Chinese club Shanghai Port.

Career

Vélez Sarsfield
Vargas started his professional career with Vélez Sarsfield under Miguel Ángel Russo's coaching, entering the field in a 0–0 draw with Colón for the 2015 Argentine Primera División.

His first game as a starter was against Defensa y Justicia for the 2016–17 Argentine Primera División under Omar De Felippe's coaching, in which he scored a goal to help his team to a 2–1 victory. He went on to play 16 games (13 as a starter) in the season, scoring four goals.

Espanyol
On 14 July 2019, Vargas joined La Liga side RCD Espanyol on a five-year deal, for a reported club record fee of €10.5 million. He made his competitive debut in Europa League third qualifying round as a substitute and also scored a goal in a 3–0 win against Luzern.

On 25 August 2021, Vargas was loaned to Turkish Süper Lig side Adana Demirspor, for one year.

Shanghai Port
On 24 August 2022, Espanyol transferred Vargas to Chinese Super League side Shanghai Port for a fee of around £3.5 million.

International career
Vargas made his international debut for Argentina on 8 September 2018 in a 3–0 international friendly against the Guatemala national football team.

Personal life
Vargas' father Omar, nicknamed Mono, was a former footballer who played for San Martín de Mendoza and Gimnasia y Esgrima de Mendoza, among other teams.

References

External links

Argentine footballers
1997 births
Living people
Argentina international footballers
Argentine Primera División players
La Liga players
Segunda División players
Süper Lig players
Club Atlético Vélez Sarsfield footballers
RCD Espanyol footballers
Adana Demirspor footballers
Argentine expatriate footballers
Argentine expatriate sportspeople in Spain
Argentine expatriate sportspeople in Turkey
Expatriate footballers in Spain
Expatriate footballers in Turkey
People from Salta
Association football wingers
Sportspeople from Salta Province
Shanghai Port F.C. players
Argentine expatriate sportspeople in China
Expatriate footballers in China